Presbytery and presbyterium may refer to:

 Presbyterium, a body of ordained, active priests in the Catholic or Anglican churches
 Presbytery (architecture), the area of a church building more commonly referred to as the "chancel" or "sanctuary"
 Presbytery (church polity), a governing body of elders in Presbyterianism
 Presbytery (residence), a clergy house, especially for the home of one or more Roman Catholic priests

See also 
 Presbyter
 :Category:Presbyteries and classes